Andrew Ter Ern Loke is a Singaporean Christian theologian and philosopher. He is currently Associate Professor in the Department of Religion and Philosophy at Hong Kong Baptist University. He has made contributions to the fields of Systematic Theology, Science and Religion, Philosophy of Religion, and New Testament studies. He is a proponent of the Kalam Cosmological Argument for the existence of God. He is an elected Fellow of the International Society for Science and Religion.

Early Background and Career
After graduating from Faculty of Medicine, National University of Singapore, Loke worked as a medical doctor. He completed his M.A in philosophy at Biola University and Ph.D. in Theology at King’s College London under the supervision of Alister McGrath. In 2014, he joined University of Hong Kong as Research Assistant Professor and was invited to teach Faith and Science at Regent College Vancouver and Master of Theology at Singapore Bible College.

Public Debates
Loke has debated the existence of God and the historicity of the resurrection of Jesus with prominent scholars, including Graham Oppy, Alex Malpass, and Shabir Ally.

Publications
Loke, Andrew. 2014. A Kryptic Model of the Incarnation. Routledge New Critical Thinking in Religion, Theology and Biblical Studies series. London: Routledge.
Loke, Andrew. 2017. The Origins of Divine Christology. Society for New Testament Studies Monograph Series. Cambridge: Cambridge University Press.
Loke, Andrew. 2017. God and Ultimate Origins: A Novel Cosmological Argument. Palgrave Frontiers in Philosophy of Religion Series. Cham, Switzerland: Springer Nature.
Loke, Andrew. 2020. Investigating the Resurrection of Jesus Christ: A New Transdisciplinary Approach. Routledge New Critical Thinking in Religion, Theology and Biblical Studies series. London: Routledge.
Loke, Andrew. 2022. The Teleological and Kalam Cosmological Arguments Revisited. Palgrave
Loke, Andrew. 2022. The Origin of Humanity and Evolution: Science and Scripture in Conversation. Bloomsbury Publishing
Loke, Andrew. 2022. Evil, Sin, and Christian Theism. Routledge

See also
Kalam Cosmological Argument

References

Analytic philosophers
Christian apologists
Critics of atheism
Living people
Philosophers of religion
Protestant philosophers
Academic staff of Hong Kong Baptist University
Singaporean philosophers
Year of birth missing (living people)